Collaborations 2 is the tenth studio album by Punjabi singer Sukshinder Shinda, released on 26 February 2009 worldwide making his second collaborated album. The album was also released internationally to USA, Canada, and U.K.

The album was preceded by the lead single, Ghum Shum Ghum Shum which featured Rahat Fateh Ali Khan. The song was also Shinda's first with Rahat. Following the success of his first single, Yarrian Banai Rakhi Yaarian featuring Jazzy B, was released which was another success. Despite success with two singles from the album, the album received positive reviews.

Track listing

References

2009 albums